Chandrasekharan is a surname. Notable people with the surname include:

E. Chandrasekharan (born 1948), Indian politician
Guru Chandrasekharan (1916–1998), Indian dancer and choreographer
K. S. Chandrasekharan (1920–2017), Indian number theorist
Kottakkal Chandrasekharan, Indian dancer
Salem Chandrasekharan, Indian film producer
T. P. Chandrasekharan (1960–2012), Indian politician